Nanguan may refer to:

Nanguan music (南管), a style of Chinese classical music
Nanguan District (南关区), Changchun, Jilin
Subdistricts (南关街道)
Nanguan Subdistrict, Suzhou, Anhui, in Yongqiao District, Suzhou, Anhui
Nanguan Subdistrict, Baoding, in Nanshi District, Baoding, Hebei
Nanguan Subdistrict, Zhangjiakou, in Xuanhua District, Zhangjiakou, Hebei
Nanguan Subdistrict, Anyang, in Wenfeng District, Anyang, Henan
Nanguan Subdistrict, Xuchang, in Weidu District, Xuchang, Henan
Nanguan Subdistrict, Zhengzhou, in Guancheng Hui District, Zhengzhou, Henan
Nanguan Subdistrict, Datong, in Cheng District, Datong, Shanxi
Nanguan Subdistrict, Jiaozhou, in Jiaozhou City, Shandong
Nanguan Subdistrict, Weifang, in Weicheng District, Weifang, Shandong

Towns (南关镇)
Nanguan, Zunyi, in Honghuagang District, Zunyi, Guizhou
Nanguan, Lingshi County, in Lingshi County, Shanxi